"Beautiful Crazy" is a song recorded by American country music singer Luke Combs. The song, which he wrote with Wyatt Durrette and Robert Williford, is a bonus track to his 2017 debut album This One's for You. The song had gained viral attention prior to its release as a single.

History
Before being released as a single, Combs posted videos to Facebook of himself performing the song. It also became a regular performance in his concerts, and in 2018, he re-issued his debut album This One's for You (titled This One's for You Too) with a studio version as a bonus track. It was officially sent to radio with an adds date of December 3, 2018. Taste of Country describes the song as "a slow, personal love song that truly showcases the singer's talents".

Chart performance
On the Hot Country Songs chart dated May 19, 2018, "Beautiful Crazy" debuted at number 6, Combs's highest debut on that chart at the time. The song had not been released as a single at the time, but achieved this position through downloads and streaming following the release of This One's for You Too.  The song reached the top 10 at Country Airplay while Combs' previous single "She Got the Best of Me" was still falling out of the top 10. It reached number one on the Country Airplay chart dated March 2, 2019, making Combs the first artist to send his or her first five singles to number one since the inception of Nielsen SoundScan in January 1990. It stayed there for seven weeks until it was dethroned by Brett Young's "Here Tonight", becoming Combs' longest reign at number one. The same week, it reached number one on the Hot Country Songs chart, becoming his second number one on that chart. It also reached number one on  Country Streaming Songs and Country Digital Song Sales. The song's seven-week reign atop Country Airplay was the longest since the chart's inception in 2012 and the longest for a song based strictly off airplay since "Live Like You Were Dying" by Tim McGraw in 2004. It also stayed at number one on the Hot Country Songs chart for 11 weeks.

The song was certified 9x Platinum by the RIAA on March 14, 2023. It has sold 610,000 copies in the United States as of March 2020.

Personnel
From This One's for You Too liner notes.

 Luke Combs - lead vocals
 Aubrey Haynie – fiddle
 Wil Houchens – keyboards
 Carl Miner – acoustic guitar
 Scott Moffatt – electric guitar, background vocals, producer, mixing
 Gary Morse – pedal steel guitar
 Sol Philcox-Littlefield – electric guitar
 Jerry Roe – drums, percussion
 Jimmie Lee Sloas – bass guitar

Charts

Weekly charts

Year-end charts

Decade-end charts

Certifications

References

2018 singles
2018 songs
Country ballads
2010s ballads
Luke Combs songs
Songs written by Luke Combs
Songs written by Wyatt Durrette (songwriter)
Columbia Nashville Records singles